Robert Bridge Richardson,  (born August 27, 1955) is an American cinematographer. He has won the Academy Award for Best Cinematography three times, for his work on JFK, The Aviator, and Hugo. Richardson is and has been a frequent collaborator for several directors, including Oliver Stone, John Sayles, Errol Morris, Quentin Tarantino, Martin Scorsese, and Andy Serkis. Known for his trademark aggressively bright highlight as well as shapeshifting style, he is one of three living persons who has won the Academy Award for Best Cinematography three times, the others being Vittorio Storaro and Emmanuel Lubezki.

Life and career
Richardson was born in Hyannis, Massachusetts. He graduated from the Rhode Island School of Design with a BFA in Film/Animation/Video and received his MFA from AFI Conservatory. Richardson's work began as a camera operator and 2nd unit photographer on such features as Alex Cox's Repo Man, Dorian Walker's Making the Grade and Wes Craven's A Nightmare on Elm Street (all in 1984). At the same time he also served as cinematographer on TV documentaries and docudramas such as America, America for The Disney Channel, God's Peace for the BBC and PBS' The Front Line: El Salvador. His television work and documentary style filmmaking led to his meeting Oliver Stone, who hired him to "shoot" Salvador (1986).

Oliver Stone's major motion picture debut was also Richardson's first film as director of photography. Salvador was also filmed the same year as Stone's Platoon. Platoon would earn Richardson his first Oscar nomination for Best Cinematography. In 1987, Richardson reteamed with Stone on Wall Street. In 1988, he filmed Eight Men Out for John Sayles. In 1989, he earned his second Best Cinematography Oscar nomination for Stone's Born on the Fourth of July.

In 1991, Richardson won the first of his Best Cinematography Academy Awards for his work on Stone's JFK; he also shot Stone's The Doors that same year. He worked with Sayles again in 1991 for City of Hope. In 1992, he worked as director of photography on Rob Reiner's A Few Good Men and served as a 2nd unit photographer for Haskell Wexler on To the Moon, Alice, a "Showtime 30-Minute Movie" (for which he was also credited as visual consultant). He began a long working relationship with Martin Scorsese in 1995, with Casino. Also in 1995, he was cinematographer on Stone's Nixon. In 1997, Richardson photographed Errol Morris's documentary Fast, Cheap and Out of Control as well as filming the majority of Stone's U Turn and serving as director of photography for Barry Levinson's Wag the Dog.

Richardson worked on the 2013 zombie film World War Z, but asked for his name to be taken off the final product. The credited cinematographer is Ben Seresin.

Richardson has four children, Kanchan, Maya, Bibi and Madeleine. His family previously ran the Cape Cod Sea Camps situated on the Cape Cod Bay prior to selling it in 2021.

Filmography
Film

Documentary films

Awards

Academy Awards

BAFTA Awards

American Society of Cinematographers

Satellite Awards

Other Awards

References

External links
 
 
 American Cinematographer Magazine, interview with Robert Richardson about The Aviator

1955 births
American cinematographers
AFI Conservatory alumni
Best Cinematographer Academy Award winners
Independent Spirit Award winners
Living people
Rhode Island School of Design alumni
People from Hyannis, Massachusetts